The Fresco River is a river of Pará state in north-central Brazil. It is a right tributary of Xingu River, which it joins at São Félix do Xingu.

The Fresco River is a blackwater river.
Its basin is in the Xingu–Tocantins–Araguaia moist forests ecoregion.

See also
List of rivers of Pará

References

Rivers of Pará